Denigo Ebinipere (born 10 June 1990 in Brass) is a Nigerian footballer who currently plays for Bayelsa United.

Career
The defender played 2009/2010 for Ocean Boys F.C. in the CAF Confederation Cup, after the win of the Nigerian FA Cup in 2008. After eight years with Ocean Boys F.C., he signed on 10 May 2012 with league rival Dolphins F.C.

Honours
 2008: FA Cup Winner

References 

1990 births
Living people
Nigerian footballers
Ocean Boys F.C. players
Dolphin F.C. (Nigeria) players
Bayelsa United F.C. players
Association football defenders